This is a list of electoral results for the electoral district of Ripponlea in Victorian state elections.

Members for Ripponlea

Election results

Elections in the 1950s

 Two party preferred vote was estimated.

References

Victoria (Australia) state electoral results by district